Tony Akoak (born 1957 or 1958) is a Canadian politician, who is the 12th and current Speaker of the Legislative Assembly. He was elected to the Legislative Assembly of Nunavut in the 2013 election. He represents the electoral district of Gjoa Haven.

References

1950s births
Living people
Members of the Legislative Assembly of Nunavut
Inuit from Nunavut
Inuit politicians
People from Gjoa Haven
21st-century Canadian politicians
Inuit from the Northwest Territories